Leïla Maknoun (born 19 January 1992) is a footballer who plays as a forward for Italian Serie B club Apulia Trani.

Born in France, she represented her native country internationally at under-16 level, before switching allegiance to Tunisia in 2010, making her senior debut in 2014.

Club career
Maknoun played for Paris FC, Saint-Maur B, Blanc-Mesnil and then PSG U19, PSG B and the first team of PSG. She later played mostly in the second division. In January 2022, she moved to Apulia Trani in Italy.

Career statistics

International
Scores and results list Tunisia's goal tally first

See also
 List of Tunisia women's international footballers

References

External links
 
 
 Leïla Maknoun at the Tunisian Football Federation
 Leïla Maknoun at Footofeminin.fr
 Leïla Maknoun at Syracusewomenslacrosse.com

1992 births
Living people
Citizens of Tunisia through descent
Tunisian women's footballers
Women's association football forwards
Tunisia women's international footballers
Tunisian expatriate footballers
Tunisian expatriate sportspeople in Italy
Expatriate women's footballers in Italy
Footballers from Paris
French women's footballers
Paris Saint-Germain Féminine players
En Avant Guingamp (women) players
GPSO 92 Issy players
Division 1 Féminine players
French expatriate women's footballers
French expatriate sportspeople in Italy
French sportspeople of Tunisian descent